Maoricrater explorata is a southern, cold-water species of limpet, a marine gastropod mollusc in the family Lepetidae, the true limpets. It is found in New Zealand.

References

 Powell A. W. B., William Collins Publishers Ltd, Auckland 1979 

Lepetidae
Gastropods of New Zealand
Gastropods described in 1956